The Teatro Vaccaj or Vaccai is a historic opera house in Tolentino, Italy.

History and description
In the late 18th century, in part under the patronage of Cardinal Carandini, this public theater was built. It was initially called the Teatro dell’Aquila, in part due to the eagle on the Cardinal's coat of arms. The theater with its Neoclassical facade, was designed by Giuseppe Lucatelli and inaugurated on 10 September 1797. Napoleon had recently visited the town in his conquest of Italy. Lucatelli painted some of the panels and medallions from the alcoves surrounding the main seating.  In 1881, the theater was restored by Luigi Fontana, and rededicated to the native musician Nicola Vaccaj. The ceiling was frescoed to depict Apollo and the muses in Olympus. The former sipario or theater curtain depicted illustrious persons from Tolentino, including Francesco Filelfo and Niccolò Mauruzi, burned during a fire in 2008. The present sipario is an 18th-century curtain by Fontana. In 1975, the theater underwent a ten-year restoration. After the fire in 2008, another ten year refurbishment occurred.

References

Opera houses in Italy
1797 establishments in Italy
Neoclassical architecture in Italy
Buildings and structures in Tolentino